Oto Rebula (14 August 1921 – 11 July 2001) was a Serbian athlete. He competed in the men's decathlon at the 1948 Summer Olympics and the 1952 Summer Olympics, representing Yugoslavia.

References

1921 births
2001 deaths
Athletes (track and field) at the 1948 Summer Olympics
Athletes (track and field) at the 1952 Summer Olympics
Serbian decathletes
Olympic athletes of Yugoslavia
Sportspeople from Banja Luka